Hasan bey Agalarov was a Russian military leader of Azerbaijani origin, lieutenant general in Imperial Russian Army. He became the first Azerbaijani to be awarded the Order of St. George directly in the course of hostilities (distinguished himself in the battle of Debrecen on 21 July 1849 during the suppression of the Hungarian uprising of 1848-1849).

Military activities 
Hasan bey Agalarov was born in 1812 in Tbilisi in a noble family. Received general education at the Tbilisi gymnasium. He enrolled in the military service in 1834, Transcaucasian Equestrian Muslim regiment. As part of the Transcaucasian equestrian Muslim regiment he was sent to Warsaw in November 1834, along with his fellow Azerbaijanis staff captain Ismayil Bek Kutkashensky and Lieutenant Jafargulu Bakikhanov (Abbasgulu Bakikhanov's younger brother). He was promoted to praporschik on 8 October 1835 in Warsaw.

In 1840, Agalarov was awarded the Order of St. Stanislav of the 3rd rank for excellent service. His Transcaucasian equestrian Muslim regiment participated in the battles for Debrecen, crushed the Hungarian rebels during the suppression of the Hungarian uprising and captured four enemy cannons successfully in 1849. For this battle, the regiment was awarded the St. George flag. As for himself, as the assistant commander of the regiment, he was awarded the Order of St. George 4th class on 28 August 1849 (No. 8147 according to the list of Grigorovich – Stepanov's knight list).

According to Field-Marshal Ivan Paskevich "in the battle with the rebellious Hungarians at the city of Debrecen, on 21 July 1849, being with three hundred Transcaucasian Equestrian Muslim Regiment on the left flank, during the attack with special selflessness he rushed to the enemy infantry and completely destroyed it, and recaptured the first two guns and charging box; then, pursuing the enemy through the city, he took 300 prisoners and the entire convoy".

He was appointed commander of the Transcaucasian equestrian Muslim regiment in 1852. Later on 17 April 1857 was promoted to major general, transferred to Separate Caucasian Corps. Another promotion followed on 8 November 1877 when he was promoted to Lieutenant General.

Personal life 
Agalarov was friends with many prominent Tbilisi aristocrats, among them - Generals Israfil bey Yadigarov, Ismayil Bek Kutkashensky, translator and adviser to the viceroy Aga bey Yadigarov, playwright Mirza Fatali Akhundov and poet Gasim bey Zakir, to whom the general helped when he was exiled.

He was married to Bike Agha, daughter of Ahmed Khan Javanshir (son of Ibrahim Khalil Khan of Karabakh). Together they had a son, Davud-agha and a daughter, Maria Khanum. His death date is unknown.

Orders and decorations 

  - Order of St. Stanislav 3rd class (1840)
  - Order of St. George 4th class (1849)
  - Order of St. Vladimir 3rd class (1860)
  - Order of St. Stanislav of the 1st class for Muslims (1863)
  - Order of St. Anne of the 1st class for Muslims (1871)
  - Order of St. Vladimir 2nd class with swords (1878)
  - Order of the Iron Crown, 2nd class (1850)
  - Order of Leopold 2nd class (1853)
  - Order of the Red Eagle 3rd class (1853)

References 

1812 births
Recipients of the Order of St. Vladimir, 2nd class
Recipients of the Order of St. Vladimir, 3rd class
Recipients of the Order of St. Anna, 1st class
Recipients of the Order of Saint Stanislaus (Russian), 3rd class
Year of death missing
Recipients of the Order of St. George of the Fourth Degree
Azerbaijani nobility
Azerbaijani generals
Imperial Russian Army generals
Georgian Azerbaijanis